Independence Day (also known as Araw ng Kalayaan, "Day of Freedom") is an annual national holiday in the Philippines observed on June 12, commemorating the declaration of Philippine independence from Spain in 1898.

History

The earliest recorded event related to the holiday was when Andres Bonifacio, along with Emilio Jacinto, Restituto Javier, Guillermo Masangkay, Aurelio Tolentino, Faustino Manalak, Pedro Zabala and few other Katipuneros went to Pamitinan Cave in Montalban, Rizal to initiate new members of the Katipunan.  Bonifacio wrote Viva la independencia Filipina! or Long Live Philippine independence on walls of the cave to express the goal of their secret society. Bonifacio also led the Cry of Pugad Lawin, which signals the beginning of the Philippine Revolution. Members of the Katipunan, led by Bonifacio, tore their community tax certificates (cedulas personales) in protest of Spanish conquest.

The Philippine Revolution began in 1896. The Pact of Biak-na-Bato, signed on December 14, 1897, established a truce between the Spanish colonial government and the Filipino revolutionaries. Under its terms, Emilio Aguinaldo and other revolutionary leaders went into exile in Hong Kong after receiving 400,000 pesos from the Spanish Government.

At the outbreak of the Spanish–American War, Commodore George Dewey sailed from Hong Kong to Manila Bay leading the U.S. Navy Asiatic Squadron. On May 1, 1898, Dewey defeated the Spanish in the Battle of Manila Bay, which effectively put the U.S. in control of the Spanish colonial government. Later that month, the U.S. Navy transported Aguinaldo back to the Philippines. Aguinaldo arrived on May 19, 1898 in Cavite.

On June 5, 1898, Aguinaldo issued a decree at his house located in what was then known as Cavite El Viejo proclaiming June 12, 1898 as the day of independence. The Acta de la Proclamacion de la Independencia del Pueblo Filipino was solemnly read by its author, Ambrosio Rianzares Bautista, Aguinaldo's war counselor and special delegate. The 21-page declaration was signed by 98 Filipinos, appointed by Aguinaldo, and one retired American artillery officer, Colonel L. M. Johnson. The Philippine flag was officially unfurled for the first time at about 4:30 p.m, as the Marcha Nacional Filipina was played by the band of San Francisco de Malabon.

The proclamation was promulgated by 190 municipal presidents from the 16 provinces controlled by the revolutionary army on August 1, 1898 at Bacoor, and was officially ratified on September 29, 1898 by the Malolos Congress.

The Philippines failed to win international recognition of its independence, specifically including the United States of America and Spain. The Spanish government later ceded the Philippine archipelago to the United States in the 1898 Treaty of Paris. The Philippines Revolutionary Government did not recognize the treaty and the two sides subsequently fought what was known as the Philippine–American War.

The United States of America granted independence to the Philippines on July 4, 1946. In accordance with the Philippine Independence Act (more popularly known as the "Tydings–McDuffie Act"), President Harry S. Truman issued Proclamation 2695 of July 4, 1946 officially recognizing the independence of the Philippines. On the same day, the Treaty of Manila was signed.

July 4 was chosen as the date by the United States because it corresponds to the United States' Independence Day, and that day was observed in the Philippines as Independence Day until 1962. On May 12, 1962, President Diosdado Macapagal issued Presidential Proclamation No. 28, which declared June 12 a special public holiday throughout the Philippines, "... in commemoration of our people's declaration of their inherent and inalienable right to freedom and independence." On August 4, 1964, Republic Act No. 4166 renamed July 4 holiday as "Philippine Republic Day", proclaimed June 12 as "Philippine Independence Day", and enjoined all citizens of the Philippines to observe the latter with befitting rites.

Flag Day

Prior to 1964, June 12 was observed as Flag Day in the country. In 1965, President Diosdado Macapagal issued Proclamation No. 374, which moved National Flag Day to May 28 (the date the Philippine Flag was first flown in the patriot victory in the Battle of Alapan located in Imus, Cavite in 1898). In 1994, President Fidel V. Ramos issued Executive Order No. 179, extending the celebration period from May 28 to Philippine Independence Day on June 12, ordering government departments, agencies, offices, government owned and controlled corporations, state agencies, and local government units, and even private establishments, to prominently display the National Flag in all public buildings, government institutions, and official residences during this period; ordering the Department of Education, in coordination with the private sector, non-government organizations, and socio-civic groups, to enjoin the prominent display of the National Flag in all public squares and, whenever practicable, in all private buildings and homes in celebration of national independence.

Holiday customs 
Most government offices are closed on that day as this is a national holiday and so also are most educational institutions, either public or private. Since 2020–2021, June marks the formal end of the academic year for most schools and educational institutions.

As required by law, the Flag of the Philippines, first flown on that day in 1898, is displayed in homes and establishments from as early as May 28, Flag Day, or on a selected date of May by the National Historical Commission of the Philippines, which serves as the organizer of the celebrations, to the 30th of the month. Kawit, Cavite holds a yearly commemorative act with the flag raising at the Aguinaldo Shrine and the reading of the Philippine Declaration of Independence. Worldwide, Filipinos gather on June 12 or a date close to it to publicly celebrate, sometimes with a parade. There are also local celebrations as well, as well as a national celebration in Manila, the national capital, which in past years included a civil-military parade of uniformed organizations and public and private entitles, the last major parade was held in 2018 to mark the 120th year of nationhood.

Expanded summary of the parade  

In the afternoon after the holiday toast ceremony or in the hours after the morning ceremonies in Manila, the commemorations continue with the civil-military parade at the historic Quirino Grandstand. For many years the civil-military parade in the capital was part of the national celebrations and was a key highlight.

The parade begins with the arrival of the President, Vice President and other guests in attendance. On the moment of the President's arrival, together with the AFP Chief of Staff, full arrival honors are given by a company of cadets of the Philippine Military Academy and members of the Presidential Security Group with the PSG Band or PMA Band in attendance. As the band plays the honors music "Marangal na Parangal" and the combined honor guard presents arms, a 21-gun salute is performed by a select battery from the Philippine Army Artillery Regiment  in the same time. As the march ends, the honor guard commander orders the parade to order arms and informs the President and the CSAFP of the readiness of the honor guard to be reviewed. The guard is then reviewed as the band plays a inspectiob march and the two salute the colour guard. As the review ends the honor guard presents arms again and afterwards, after the guard orders arms, the commander informs the President of the end of the inspection of the guards. They march off as the President and the CSAFP walk towards the grandstand area to meet the other dignitaries present.

It is followed by the National Anthem, a joint holiday ecumenical prayer, and later by the opening remarks and the Presidential address if needed.

Cultural performance 
Before the parade would start, performances by dance groups and choirs celebrating the anniversary of the nation's independence follow the Presidential address. The traditional cultural performance is a retelling in theatrical form of the Revolutionary period leading up to the formal declaration of independence and the proclamation of the First Republic.

Civil military parade 

As the military parade portion commences, the AFP Combined Band plays "AFP on the March" as it marches past the grandstand and takes post to give way to the AFP parade, led by a general officer and his staff (either on foot or motorized) and followed by the color guard carrying and escorting the National Flag, the Armed Forces Flag and the component flags of the AFP and the combined color guard of the Philippine Marine Corps carrying the colors of the different units, commands and institutions of the Armed Forces. The parade commander in this segment is usually a Major General or Rear Admiral. Following the AFP contingents are units of the Philippine National Police, Bureau of Fire Protection and the Philippine Coast Guard. Joining them is a flypast of aircraft belonging to the AFP, PNP and PCG, and drive pasts of different vehicles of the uniformed services.

A civil parade segment follows at the end of the military parade. It is composed of contingents from the government and the private sector marching past the dignitaries. Floats celebrating the national holiday and marching bands take centerstage passing by the dignitaries in this segment. A civilian mobile column is also part of this segment. A common saying during the parade is "Viva la independencia Filipina!".

Full order of the military parade 

 Armed Forces of the Philippines Divisional Contingent
 Parade Commander and Staff
 National, Armed Forces And MSCs Color Guard
 Armed Forces Units Color Guard
 AFP Composite Band
 1st Parade Brigade
 Brigade Commander and Staff
 Philippine Military Academy
 Officer Candidate Schools of the Armed Forces
 Presidential Security Group
 Philippine Army Security and Escort Battalion
 Philippine Air Force Honor and Escort Squadron
 Philippine Navy Headquarters Security Group
 AFP General Headquarters and Headquarters Service Command
 AFP Technical and Administrative Service
 2nd Parade Brigade
 Brigade Commander and Staff 
 Philippine Army Infantry
 Philippine Marine Corps
 Composite battalion of Philippine Navy base personnel
 710th Special Operations Wing
 AFP Special Operations Command Combined Regiment
 1st Battalion: Army Scout Rangers, Special Forces Regiment and Light Reaction Regiment
 2nd Battalion: Naval Special Operations, Marine Special Operations and company of Armed Forces EOD experts
 AFP Composite Female Battalion
 Joint Task Force NCR
 Composite regiment of Armed Forces Reserve Command
 ROTC
 Active Reserves
 AFP Peacekeeping Operations Center Cadet Battalion
 Philippine National Police Divisional Contingent
 Parade Commander and Staff
 Philippine National Police Band
 PNP Color Guard
 1st Parade Brigade
 Corps of Cadets, Philippine National Police Academy 
 National Police Institute Cadet Battalion
 Highway Patrol Group
 Criminal Investigation and Detection Group
 PNP National Capital Region Police Office composite regiment
 Headquarters personnel
 Regional Public Safety Battalion
 Composite battalion of personnel of police districts and city police offices
 Composite SWAT battalion
 PNP Maritime Group
 2nd Parade Brigade
 National Police Institute Cadet Battalions in training and combat uniforms
 Philippine National Police Aviation Security Group
 Drug Enforcement Group
 PNP Special Action Force
 Explosives Ordinance Disposal and Cannine Group
 Composite battalion of SAR personnel from NCR Police Office
 PNP Health Service

See also
List of national independence days
RP612fic – a social media event held every Philippine Independence Day since 2009

References

Public holidays in the Philippines
June observances
Philippines